"La Popola" is a song by Puerto Rican reggaetón recording artist Glory, from her debut studio album, Glou (2005). It was composed by Glory, produced by Eliel and released as the album's lead single. The song originally appeared on Eliel's El Que Habla Con Las Manos in 2004. It was banned in the Dominican Republic for its vulgar lyrical content.

Background
Before venturing as a solo artist, Glory appeared on several songs by artists including Daddy Yankee, Don Omar, Héctor & Tito and Eddie Dee. She appeared on Yankee's successful "Gasolina" delivering the hook "dame más gasolina", and Omar's "Dale Don Dale" with the hook "suelta como gabete".

Lyrics
Tú querias popola,
Pues agarra que no tienes pila,
Agüichi, chi,
(A todo gavete),
Nos fuimos,
Escobar,
Gata gangster,

Yo toqué, Y llamé,
Y nadie me contesto,

Aahhhy, no me des más na',
Que me duele la popola,
Ay dale por allá,
Pa' que descanse la popola,

El compa y don Facundo,
No la deja descansar,
Así ta' su mujer,
Ella le pide sin parar,

Cuando se va pa el barrio,
Él la busca por to' lado,
Así 'ca su mujer,
Le dicen sonrifiao',

Aahhhy, no me des más na',
Que me duele la popola,
Ay dale por allá,
Pa' que descanse la popola,

Quien más,
(Glow),
Santo Domingo,
El Cibao,
República,
Puelto Lico y Latinoamérica
La popola pa' to' el mundo,
Escobar,
Dile a Eliel que me llevo la popola,
Me la llevo, me la llevo,
Se acabo.

Composition and controversy

In the Dominican Republic, the song was banned by the countries' Comisión Nacional de Espectáculos Públicos y Radiofonía, (National Commission of Public Entertainment) in late 2004, due to its vulgar lyrical content. It has also been banned in several Latin American countries for its exceedingly sexual lyrics. The term "popola" is used to refer to the watermelon fruit as well as the female sex organ. It was considered disrespectful to women. The song's musical aesthetics lean heavily toward the Dominican musical genre of merengue. Musically, it features major key tonality, mixed acoustic and electric instrumentation, an accordion playing and prominent percussion according to the Music Genome Project.

Reception and cover versions
While reviewing Eliel's El Que Habla Con Las Manos, AllMusic's Evan Gutierrez stated that "La Popola" was one of the album's only highlights along with Don Omar's "Ronca". He continued by stating that "the other 19 tracks tend to run together into a nondescript, formulaic mishmash." It was covered by Reggaetones in 2006 on their second studio album, Fury of Reggaeton Hits. Yahari also performed a cover of the song on his 2005 album Las + Bailables de...Yahari. The song has appeared on several other compilation albums including Reggaeton Hitmakers 2000/2005: The Video (2005), Album of the Year: Las Mas Bailables (2006), Machete World Remixes, Part 1 (2006), and 2007's VI Music 30 Video Collection. A karaoke version of the song was released as a single on 19 March 2013 by Ameritz Spanish Karaoke.

Charts
The song was released as the album's lead single on 19 March 2005 by Machete Music. It received barely sufficient airplay in Puerto Rico and none in the Dominican Republic. On the Billboard Tropical Songs chart, "La Popola" debuted at number 26 for the week of 26 March 2005. Ten weeks later, the song peaked at number ten for the week of 28 May 2005. In Billboard magazine, the song is credited to Eliel instead of Glory as the performer.

References

2004 songs
2005 singles
Reggaeton songs
Spanish-language songs
Censorship of music
Machete Music singles